Schinia chryselloides is a moth of the family Noctuidae. It is found in Colorado from the base of the foothills in Jefferson County, east to Lincoln County, in extreme south-eastern Colorado, south to south-eastern Socorro County, New Mexico, and east to the south-eastern panhandle of Texas and extreme southern Texas.

The wingspan is about 21 mm. Adults are on wing from June to September.

External links
Images
Systematics of Schinia chrysellus (Grote) complex: Revised status of Schinia alencis (Harvey) with a description of two new species (Lepidoptera: Noctuidae: Heliothinae)

Schinia
Moths of North America
Moths described in 2005